The South Manchester Reporter is an English weekly newspaper published every Thursday. Distributed in South Manchester, it sells around 6,000–6,200 copies per week and is read by an estimated 57,000 people, making it one of the most widely read subsidiaries of the Manchester Evening News. The paper has also merged with another of South Manchester's newspapers, the local version of the Manchester Metro News.

It began life on 10 November 1978 as the Withington Reporter, but the name was changed to The Reporter  in March 1980, and again to the South Manchester Reporter in November 1988.

The South Manchester Reporter covers the following areas:
 Burnage
 Chorlton
 Didsbury
 Fallowfield
 Ladybarn
 Levenshulme
 Northenden
 Old Moat
 Withington
 Whalley Range

References 

Newspapers published in Manchester
Newspapers published by Reach plc